The Back Creek, a perennial stream of the Richmond River catchment, is located in Northern Rivers region in the state of New South Wales, Australia.

Location and features
The river flows generally south southeast, joined by three minor tributaries before reaching its confluence with the Leycester Creek near the village of Leycester. The river descends  over its  course.

See also

 Rivers of New South Wales
 List of rivers of New South Wales (A-K)
 List of rivers of Australia

References

External links
 

Northern Rivers
Rivers of New South Wales